Zingiberidae is a botanical name at the rank of subclass. Circumscription of the subclass will vary with the taxonomic system being used (there are many such systems); the only requirement being that it includes the family Zingiberaceae.

Cronquist system
The Cronquist system (1981) treats this as one of four subclasses in class Liliopsida (=monocotyledons). It consists of: 
 subclass Zingiberidae
 order Zingiberales
 order Bromeliales

APG II system
The APG II system does not use formal botanical names above the rank of order. The plants involved here are assigned to order Zingiberales and Poales, both monocots.

References

Monocots